Overcharging can refer to: 

 Overcharging (law), a prosecutorial practice
 Overcharging a rechargeable battery
 Overcharge, charging a customer too much